Västra Götaland County  is a county or län on the western coast of Sweden.

The county is the second most populous of Sweden's counties and it comprises 49 municipalities (kommuner). Its population of 1,616,000 amounts to 17% of Sweden's population. The formal capital and seat of the governor of Västra Götaland County is Gothenburg. The political capital and seat of the Västra Götaland Regional Council is Vänersborg.

The county was established on 1 January 1998, when Älvsborg County, Gothenburg and Bohus County and Skaraborg County were merged.

Provinces 
Sweden's counties are generally of greater importance than its provinces. The counties are the main administrative units for politics and population census counts.

Due to its size and young age, the Västra Götaland County has no common heritage. Of cultural and historical significance are the provinces that Västra Götaland County consists of: Västergötland, Bohuslän and Dalsland. There is also an insignificant part of the province Halland within the county.

In addition, the previous counties that were abolished in 1998 had been in use since the 17th century, and therefore have some cultural and historical significance.

Neighbours 
Västra Götaland County borders to the counties of Värmland, Örebro, Östergötland, Jönköping and Halland. It is also bounded by the Norwegian county of Viken both with a land and maritime border, lakes Vättern and Vänern, as well as the strait of Skagerrak.

Administration 
Västra Götaland was created in 1998 by a merger of the three former counties of Gothenburg and Bohus County, Älvsborg County and Skaraborg County. The seat of residence for the Governors or Landshövding is Gothenburg, while the seat of political administration and power is Vänersborg. The Governor is the head of the County Administrative Board or Länsstyrelse.

Politics 
The Västra Götaland Regional Council or Västra Götalandsregionen is an evolved County Council that for a trial period has assumed certain tasks from the County Administrative Board. Similar trial councils are applied for Skåne County and Gotland County.

Municipalities 

 Ale
  Alingsås
  Bengtsfors
  Bollebygd
  Borås
  Dals-Ed
  Essunga
  Falköping
  Färgelanda
  Grästorp
  Gullspång
  Götene
  Gothenburg
  Herrljunga
  Hjo
  Härryda
  Karlsborg
  Kungälv
  Lerum
  Lidköping
  Lilla Edet
  Lysekil
  Mariestad
  Mark
  Mellerud
  Munkedal
  Mölndal
  Orust
  Partille
  Skara
  Skövde
  Sotenäs
  Stenungsund
  Strömstad
  Svenljunga
  Tanum
  Tibro
  Tidaholm
  Tjörn
  Tranemo
  Trollhättan
  Töreboda
  Uddevalla
  Ulricehamn
  Vara
  Vårgårda
  Vänersborg
  Åmål
  Öckerö

Heraldry 
The arms for the County of Västra Götaland were granted in 1998 when the county was formed. They are a combination of the provincial arms of Västergötland, Bohuslän and Dalsland and the arms of the city of Gothenburg. When the arms are shown with a royal crown they represent the County Administrative Board, which is the regional presence of (royal) government authority. Blazon: "Quartered, I. the arms of Gothenburg II. the arms of Bohuslän III. the arms of Dalsland turned in courtoisie, IV. the arms of Västergötland."

References and notes

External links 
 List of Västra Götaland Governors
 Region Västra Götaland
 Västra Götaland County Administrative Board
 Gothenburg Regional Association of Local Authorities
 Sjuhärad Regional Association of Local Authorities
 Skaraborg Regional Association of Local Authorities
 Fyrbodals Regional Association of Local Authorities

 
Counties of Sweden
Bohuslän
Dalsland
Västergötland
States and territories established in 1998
1998 establishments in Sweden